This is a list of all commanders, deputy commanders, senior enlisted leaders, and chiefs of staff of the United States Africa Command.

Current headquarters staff
  Michael E. Langley, Commander
  Kirk W. Smith, Deputy Commander
  Joel Tyler, Chief of Staff
  Melvin G. Carter, Director, Intelligence (J2)
  David J. Francis, Director, Operations/Cyber (J3/6)
  George E. Bresnihan, Director, Logistics (J4)
  Kenneth Ekman, Director, Strategy, Engagement, and Programs (J5)
  Jon E. Solem, Deputy Director, Strategy, Engagement, and Programs (J5)
   Peter Bailey, Deputy Director, Strategy, Engagement, and Programs (J5)

List of commanders of the United States Africa Command

 

Commanders of U.S. Africa Command by branch of service
 Army: 4
 Marine Corps: 2
 Air Force: none
 Navy: none
 Space Force: none
 Coast Guard: none

List of deputy commanders of the United States Africa Command

List of senior enlisted leaders of the United States Africa Command

List of chiefs of staff of the United States Africa Command

See also
 United States Africa Command
 Leadership of the United States European Command
 Leadership of the United States Indo-Pacific Command
 Leadership of the United States Northern Command
 Leadership of the United States Space Command
 Leadership of the United States Cyber Command
 Leadership of the United States Strategic Command
 Leadership of the United States Transportation Command

References

Lists of American military personnel